Sageraea thwaitesii is a species of plant in the Annonaceae family. It is endemic to Sri Lanka.

References

Flora of Sri Lanka
Annonaceae
Endangered plants
Taxonomy articles created by Polbot
Taxa named by Joseph Dalton Hooker